The Syrian house gecko (Hemidactylus lavadeserticus) is a species of gecko. It is endemic to Syria.

References

Hemidactylus
Reptiles described in 1997
Reptiles of the Middle East
Endemic fauna of Syria